Canby High School is a public high school located in Canby, Oregon, United States.

Academics
In 2017, 88% of the school's seniors received a high school diploma. Of 365 students, 338 graduated, 37 dropped out.

Canby High School offers ten Advanced Placement (AP) for students including,
 AP Biology
 AP Calculus
 AP Statistics
 AP Physical Education
 AP Chemistry
 AP English Literature and Composition
 AP European History
 AP Physics
 AP Health
 AP US History
Canby also has a Dual Credit program for student to earn college credits while attending high school at the following Colleges
 Portland Community College
 Clackamas Community College
 Oregon Tech
 Blue Mountain Community College
 Central Oregon Community College

CTE Programs 
Business Classes
Agricultural Classes
Early Childhood Education Classes
Construction Classes
Manufacturing Classes
Technical Design Classes
Graphic Classes

Notable alumni
Clint Chapman, professional basketball player
Jay Baller, professional baseball player
Derek Devine, NFL quarterback
Jason Barrow, Played for the San Francisco Giants
Joni Harms, Singer, songwriter
Tarah Wheeler, cybersecurity executive, author of Women in Tech
Brandon Wolf, Pulse nightclub massacre survivor and gun control advocate

References

External links
 Canby High School
 School report

High schools in Clackamas County, Oregon
Canby, Oregon
Public high schools in Oregon